Tomasz Kułkiewicz (born April 18, 1978 in Słubice) is a Polish footballer who plays for Ruch Wysokie Mazowieckie.

Career

Club
In February 2011, he moved to Ruch Wysokie Mazowieckie.

References

External links
 

1978 births
Living people
Polish footballers
Pogoń Szczecin players
Znicz Pruszków players
Ząbkovia Ząbki players
People from Słubice
Sportspeople from Lubusz Voivodeship
Association football midfielders